Avijit Dutt is an Indian filmmaker, actor, theater director and communications consultant. Living and working out of Kolkatta. He has done his masters from Calcutta University in English Literature and began his career at an English Faculty in St. Paul's School, Darjeeling.

As a theatre director and actor he has done over 100 plays in English, Hindi & Bengali. He has written six full-length plays:
- Bamboo Flower
- Mahatma Mar Gaya
- Bombay! Bosnia!
- Breaking News
- Noor Jahan- An Empress Reveals
- Unspeakable
- 9.45 ki Express ki Citee
He has also dramatised 1084 ki Ma, by Mahasweta Devi, with Shyamanand Jalan.

He launched the Childline with UNICEF & National Human Rights Commission.

Dutt, has played noted roles in Hollywood movies like Kama Sutra: A Tale of Love, Second Best Exotic Marigold Hotel etc. He has also acted in Madras Cafe as a R&AW (Research and Analysis Wing) officer, in Jolly LLB2 as state police head and in No One Killed Jessica as a defense lawyer amongst many. He has also been in a lot of Webseries on Netflix, Amazon Prime etc.
He is, perhaps, the only actor to have two patents applied for, for a toilet solution & Health Care. His organisation, Enable, of which Dutt is Chief Motivator and Director, has built toilets across north India, though not the one he had patented, the second patent is for a process of collecting, testing and documenting blood tests for rural areas. They have covered over 60000 beneficiaries across 68 villages in India.

He has also been a TED Talks speaker on various occasions.

Filmography

Films

Web series 
{| class="wikitable"
!Year
!Title
!Role
!Platform
!Notes
|-
|2019
|The Verdict – State vs Nanavati
|V. K. Krishna Menon
|ALTBalaji and ZEE5
|
|-
|2019
|Inside Edge Season 2&3
|Basu
|Amazon Prime original
|
|-
|2019
|Delhi Crime Season 1&2
|Gururaj Dixit
|Web television series
|
|2020

"[The Hostage Directed by Sudhir Mishra] 
| Web Television Series
| Original Web series for Hotstar

|"Abhay Season 3]
| Web Television Series
| For Zee 5

References

External links
 

Living people
People from New Delhi
University of Calcutta alumni
Year of birth missing (living people)